Universitas Sarjanawiyata Taman Siswa Yogyakarta is a university in Yogyakarta City in Indonesia.

References

Universities in Indonesia
Universities in the Special Region of Yogyakarta